Walthamstow East was a parliamentary constituency in what was then the Municipal Borough of Walthamstow in east London. It returned one Member of Parliament (MP) to the House of Commons of the Parliament of the United Kingdom, elected by the first-past-the-post voting system.

The constituency was created for the 1918 general election, and abolished for the February 1974 general election, when it was combined with part of the former Walthamstow West to form the new Walthamstow constituency. However, Hale End ward was added to the new Chingford constituency.

Boundaries
1918–1950: The Urban District of Walthamstow wards of Hale End, Hoe Street, and Wood Street.

1950–1974: The Borough of Walthamstow wards of Hale End, Hoe Street, and Wood Street.

Members of Parliament

Elections

Elections in the 1910s

Elections in the 1920s

Elections in the 1930s

Elections in the 1940s

Elections in the 1950s

Elections in the 1960s

Elections in the 1970s

References 

Parliamentary constituencies in London (historic)
Constituencies of the Parliament of the United Kingdom established in 1918
Constituencies of the Parliament of the United Kingdom disestablished in 1974
Politics of the London Borough of Waltham Forest
Walthamstow